Yaponchik - a nickname widely known in the Russian-speaking criminal world. May refer to

 Mishka Yaponchik, a famous robber (1881-1919)
 Vyacheslav Ivankov (1940-2009)

Literally, yaponchik means little Japanese, though none of the two above had any Japanese ancestry.